Água de Gato is a settlement in the central part of the island of Santiago, Cape Verde. In 2010 its population was 957. It is situated at about 400 m elevation, 2 km northwest of São Domingos and 2 km east of Rui Vaz.

References

Villages and settlements in Santiago, Cape Verde
São Domingos Municipality, Cape Verde